Nasreen Rizvi, better known as Kaveeta, is a Pakistani film actress who is known for films Tere Mere Sapne (1975), Society Girl, Mohabbat Aur Mehangai (1976), Kabhi Kabhi (1978), Mutthi Bhar Chawal (1978), Mian Biwi Razi (1982) and  Qasam (1993).

Early life
Nasreen Rizvi was born in 1960 in Karachi, Pakistan. Kaveeta's mother Mehtab Rizvi also had a career in film industry and her father Tayyab Hussain Rizvi was a producer. Kaveeta's elder sister Sangeeta was already associated with Pakistani cinema.

Career

Acting
She has mostly worked in films produced and directed by her elder sister Sangeeta. Kaveeta worked in almost 70 films during her 20-year career from 1974 – 1994. In 1994, she quit the Pakistani film industry and decided to settle in the United States.

Personal life
Actress Kaveeta also known as Kavita was born as Nasreen Rizvi. She is also the aunt of British American actress Jiah Khan.

Filmography

Film
 Do Badan (1974)
 Tere Mere Sapne (1975)
 Mujhe Gale Laga Lo (1976)
 Society Girl (1976)
 Mohabbat Aur Mehngai (1976)
 Kabhi Kabhi (1978)
 Mutthi Bhar Chawal (1978)
 Mehndi Lagi Mere Hath (1980)
 Mian Biwi Razi (1982)
 Jeene Nahin Doongi (1985)
 Dakket (1989)
 Manila Ke Janbaz (1989)
 Barood Ki Chhaoon Mein (1989)
 Siren (1990)
 Hijrat (1992)
 Qasam (1993)
 Jungli Mera Naam (1994)

Awards and recognition
Kaveeta won 4 Nigar Awards - first for the film Tere Mere Sapne (1975), then her second one in 1976 for 'Best Supporting Actress' for Society Girl, third in film Jeenay Nahin Doongi and fourth in film Barood Ki Chha (1989).

References

External links
 

1960 births
Living people
Actresses from Karachi
Muhajir people
Actresses in Pashto cinema
Pakistani film actresses
20th-century Pakistani actresses
Actresses in Punjabi cinema
Nigar Award winners
21st-century Pakistani actresses
Actresses in Urdu cinema
Rizvi family